Rjukan Falls is a waterfall of 104 metres in the western part of the Westfjord valley in Tinn, a municipality in the county of Vestfold og Telemark, Norway, west of the industrial town Rjukan. The waterfall is a part of the Måne river, earlier a major tourist attraction, being one of the first floodlighted waterfalls by electricity produced by the same waterfall. In 1905 Rjukan Falls was built out to produce hydro electrical power for the saltpetre production when Norsk Hydro was established.

The name

The name (West Norse Rjúkandi) is derived from the verb rjúka 'to smoke' (referring to all the froth from the waterfall). The last element fossen, the finite form of foss 'waterfall', is a later addition.

See also 

 Rjukandefossen
 List of waterfalls

References 

Tinn
Norsk Hydro
Landforms of Vestfold og Telemark
Waterfalls of Norway